Mid Down may refer to:

The central part of County Down
Mid Down (Northern Ireland Parliament constituency)
Mid Down (UK Parliament constituency)